Proteins in the outer membrane efflux protein family form trimeric (three-piece) channels that allow export of a variety of substrates in gram-negative bacteria.  Each member of this family is composed of two repeats. The trimeric channel is composed of a 12-stranded beta-barrel that spans the outer membrane, and a long all helical barrel that spans the periplasm.

Examples include the Escherichia coli TolC outer membrane protein, which is required for proper expression of outer membrane protein genes; the Rhizobium nodulation protein; and the Pseudomonas FusA protein, which is involved in resistance to fusaric acid.

References 
 
  
Protein domains
Protein families
Outer membrane proteins